Jean Hagen (born Jean Shirley Verhagen; August 3, 1923 – August 29, 1977) was an American actress best known for her role as Lina Lamont in Singin' in the Rain (1952), for which she was nominated for an Academy Award for Best Supporting Actress. Hagen was also nominated three times for an Emmy Award for Best Supporting Actress in a Comedy Series for her role as Margaret Williams (1953–56) on the television series Make Room for Daddy.

Early life
Hagen was born August 3, 1923, in Chicago, to Christian Verhagen, a Dutch immigrant, and Marie, his Chicago-born wife. The family moved to Elkhart, Indiana, when she was 12, and she graduated from Elkhart High School. She studied drama at Northwestern University, where she was a roommate of actress Patricia Neal. She graduated from Northwestern in 1945. She also worked as an usher.

Career

Radio
Hagen began her show-business career in radio in the 1940s performing in Light of the World, Hollywood Story, and other programs. Using her maiden name (Jean Verhagen), she played Betty Webster on Those Websters.

Stage
Hagen first appeared on Broadway in Swan Song. She acted in Another Part of the Forest, Ghosts, Born Yesterday, and The Traitor.

Film and television
Her film debut was as a comical femme fatale in the 1949 Spencer Tracy and Katharine Hepburn film Adam's Rib, directed by George Cukor. The Asphalt Jungle (1950) provided Hagen with her first starring role. Hagen played Doll Conover, a woman who sticks by criminal Dix's side until the bitter end. She appeared in the film noir Side Street (1950), playing a gangster's sincere but dim girlfriend. Hagen gave a memorable comic performance in Singin' in the Rain as the vain, spoiled, and talentless silent film star Lina Lamont. She received an Academy Award nomination for Best Supporting Actress for her performance.

By 1953, she had joined the cast of the television sitcom Make Room for Daddy. For her portrayal as the first wife of Danny Thomas' character, Hagen received three Emmy Award nominations. After three seasons, she grew dissatisfied with the role and left the series. Thomas, who also produced the show, reportedly did not appreciate Hagen's departure, and her character was killed off rather than recast, the first TV character to be killed off in a family sitcom. Marjorie Lord was cast a year later as Danny's second wife and played opposite Thomas successfully for the remainder of the series.

In 1957, Hagen co-starred in an episode of Alfred Hitchcock Presents titled "Enough Rope for Two", portraying a woman who accompanies two thieves trying to retrieve stolen money from a desert mine shaft. She then appeared as Elizabeth in the 1960 episode "Once Upon a Knight" on The DuPont Show with June Allyson; Also in 1960, Hagen was Marie Brandt on Wagon Train in the episode "The Marie Brandt Story"; and in 1963 Hagen portrayed Sarah Proctor on Wagon Train in the episode “The Sarah Proctor Story”.   The following year, she guest-starred on The Andy Griffith Show in the episode "Andy and the Woman Speeder".

Although she made frequent guest appearances in television series, Hagen was unable to resume her film career in starring roles. Her health began to decline and she spent many years hospitalized or under medical care in the 1960s. After appearing with Fred MacMurray in the Disney comedy The Shaggy Dog (1959), for the remainder of career she played supporting roles, such as Marguerite LeHand, personal secretary to Franklin Delano Roosevelt, in Sunrise at Campobello (1960) and the friend of Bette Davis in Dead Ringer (1964).

Much later, in 1976, she made a comeback of sorts playing character roles in episodes of the television series Starsky and Hutch and The Streets of San Francisco. She made her final acting appearance the next year in the television movie Alexander: The Other Side of Dawn.

Personal life
Jean Hagen married actor Tom Seidel (who originated the role of Dr. Sanderson in the play Harvey) on June 12, 1947, in Brentwood, California. The couple had two children, Christine Patricia Seidel and Aric Phillip Seidel. According to Lorraine LoBianco's authoritative biography, Seidel, in his attempt to stop his wife from drinking, divorced her and gained custody of the children. It did not work; Hagen's alcoholism only worsened, finally becoming so severe by 1968 that she was hospitalized and lapsed into a coma at UCLA Medical Center. She managed to survive the ordeal, and her daughter, Christine, said that after she emerged from the coma, Hagen never drank again.

Unfortunately, another health problem arose: throat cancer. Patricia Neal wrote in her autobiography that Hagen went to Germany "'for laetrile, a supposed cure unavailable in the United States. But she was bubbly and bright and so much the way I remembered her from the old days.'"

Death
Hagen died, twenty-six days after her 54th birthday, of esophageal cancer on August 29, 1977, at the Motion Picture & Television Country House and Hospital, and was buried in Chapel of the Pines Crematory.

Honours
Hagen was nominated for a 1956 Emmy Award in the "Best actress (continuing performance)" category. She has a star on the Hollywood Walk of Fame at 1502 Vine Street for her contributions to television.

Filmography

Television appearances

Radio appearances

Notes

References

External links

1923 births
1977 deaths
American radio actresses
American film actresses
American television actresses
Deaths from cancer in California
Deaths from esophageal cancer
American people of Dutch descent
Actresses from Indiana
Actresses from Chicago
People from Elkhart, Indiana
Metro-Goldwyn-Mayer contract players
20th-century American actresses
Burials at Chapel of the Pines Crematory
California Democrats
Indiana Democrats
Illinois Democrats